Joseph Edward Victor Fairfield Daveran Singleton (1 March 1879 – 24 October 1946) was an actor of the silent era. An Australian, he appeared in 74 films between 1913 and 1925. He was born in Melbourne.

Selected filmography

 Shon the Piper (1913)
 The Squaw Man (1914)
 Brewster's Millions (1914)
 Infatuation (1915)
 Judge Not; or The Woman of Mona Diggings (1915)
 Jordan Is a Hard Road (1915)
 Daphne and the Pirate (1916)
 The Good Bad-Man (1916)
 Betsy's Burglar (1917)
 Wild and Woolly (1917) (uncredited)
 A Girl of the Timber Claims (1917)
 Aladdin and the Wonderful Lamp (1917)
 Desert Law (1918)
 The Lady of the Dugout (1918)
 Inside the Lines (1918)
 The Enchanted Barn (1919)
 The Midnight Man (1919)
 The Mayor of Filbert (1919)
 Treasure Island (1920)
 The Toll Gate (1920)
 The Great Redeemer (1920)
 Opened Shutters (1921)
 The Fighting Lover (1921)
 Cameron of the Royal Mounted (1921)
 The Bait (1921)
 Skin Deep (1922)
 Secrets of the Night (1924)

References

External links

1879 births
1946 deaths
Australian male silent film actors
Male actors from Melbourne
20th-century Australian male actors